Hutuna (sometimes spelt Hutuana) is a village in the Solomon Islands, on Rennell Island in the Rennell and Bellona province.

It is about a 30-minute boat ride from the lake end or a 1.5-hour walk from Tegano. There is a large playing field in the centre of the village.

Hutuna is the site of the eighth People First Network email station, which was established in 2003. Hutuna was one of the sites included in the 2004 JICA-USP research on the impacts of the ICT on rural development.

Location
It is on Lake Tegano and most eastern village on the island. This village is a 3-hour drive from Tigoa to Te Vaitahe where the road ends at the lake foreshore. The village is a further 1-hour boat trip.

Population

The population is approximately 300 people; the population fluctuates due to the number of people that leave their family to either go to work or school elsewhere in the Solomon Islands. Others return during the holidays or for Christmas.

Religion
Seventh Day Adventist (SDA).

Police
Generally policing is serviced by the Tigoa police station as well as a local Provincial government employed area Constable.

References

Populated places in Rennell and Bellona Province